Kyzyltash (Qıźıltaş) is a rural locality (a village) in Kugarchinsky Selsoviet, Kugarchinsky District, Bashkortostan, Russia. The population was 3 as of 2010. There are 3 streets.

Geography 
Kyzyltash is located 33 km south of Mrakovo (the district's administrative centre) by road. 2-ye Tukatovo is the nearest rural locality.

References 

Rural localities in Kugarchinsky District